Jacometto Veneziano (active 1472–1497), was an Italian painter and illuminator.

Biography
The information we have about Veneziano is mainly based on the records of the diarist and art collector Marcantonio Michiel.

From the testimony of Michiel it can be concluded that Veneziano was mainly active as a manuscript illuminator and a painter of small-scale panels, the majority of which were portraits.

He died before 10 September 1497.

References

External links
 

Italian Paintings in the Robert Lehman Collection, a collection catalog containing information about Veneziano and his works (see index; plate 96).

1460s births
1497 deaths
15th-century Italian painters
Italian male painters
Painters from Venice